Pankrác   is a neighborhood of Prague, Czech Republic

Pankrác  may also refer to:

 Czech spelling of the name Pancras
 Pankrác (Prague Metro)
 Pankrác Prison
 Pankrác Plain, Pankrác Terrace, a geomorphological and urban area in Prague